Otelo was the Office of the Telecommunications Ombudsman in the United Kingdom, superseded by Ombudsman Services.

The organisation dealt with complaints about:

 The way in which mobile and fixed phones, faxes and internet service are provided.
 Certain services such as Short Messaging Services (SMS or texting), voice mail and call forwarding
 Services and products for people with disabilities, such as text relay (an operator service that translates voice to text and text to voice) and free directory enquiries

External links
Ombudsman Services website

Ombudsmen in the United Kingdom